Pir Alvan (also Romanized as Pīr Ālvān and Pīr Alvān) is a village in Arshaq Sharqi Rural District, in the Central District of Ardabil County, Ardabil Province, Iran. At the 2006 census, its population was 60, in 22 families.

References 

Towns and villages in Ardabil County